"Peggy Sue" is a 1957 song by Buddy Holly.

Peggy Sue may also refer to:

Peggy Sue (singer) (born 1943), American country singer and songwriter
Peggy Sue (band), a British folk/pop band
"Peggy Sue", a 1995 song by Blink-182 from Cheshire Cat
Peggy Sue Got Married, a 1986 film directed by Francis Ford Coppola
Peggy Sue's Diner, a notable 1950s style American diner in Yermo, California.